Witten/Herdecke University is a private, state-recognized, nonprofit university in Witten, North Rhine-Westphalia, Germany. It was the first German private institution of higher education to receive accreditation as a "Universität", a status recognizing the university's academic quality equivalent to state-run universities and granting the right to award bachelor's and master's degrees, doctorates, and the German Habilitation.

Its foundation and history has often been marked by controversial debates and significant difficulties to establish the new university in the German educational system. In 1995, Times Higher Education noted that the university was considered by some "an idealistic model for the future of German higher education and [by] others ... a carbuncle on the country's fiercely state-dominated university landscape". Today Witten/Herdecke University has succeeded in being recognized as one of Germany's few private universities considered 'Humboldtian' and as a role model in terms of course structures, integration of practical and theoretical training and innovative approaches to payment of tuition fees.

In 2019, about 2,500 students are enrolled at the University of Witten/Herdecke, with a staff of 582, including faculty of 71 professors and 232 lecturers/researchers. About 100 PhD candidates receive a PhD degree each year from the graduate school. There are also more master's students than bachelor's students, showing the university's strength in graduate education. The university is currently enlarging its campus and increasing the number of students.

History

1982: Recognition by the Federal Government as Germany's first private university. Early supporters of the university include Alfred Herrhausen, Gerd Bucerius, Reinhard Mohn and the Bertelsmann Foundation.

1984: The degree programmes in economics and dental medicine are established

1990: The German Council of Science and Humanities reviews the university and grants it public funding support for buildings.

1993: The Institute of Fundamental Studies receives Faculty status. It will become a core element of the Witten/Herdecke identity as every student regardless of his subject has to take courses offered by the faculty, thereby gaining interdisciplinary skills and reflexive capacities.

1995: Students of the University found the StudierendenGesellschaft Witten/Herdecke, a student association which introduces and until today operates an innovative inverted generational-contract payment model for student fees. The model avoids social selection in the admission process by enabling students to repay their tuition according to their own financial capacities after they have embarked on their professional careers.

1996: The status of Witten/Herdecke University as a model university is underlined by a second review through the German Council of Science and Humanities. The state government follows recommendations to subsidize Witten/Herdecke University with public funds and the university establishes a degree programme in Nursing Science, the first of its kind in Germany.

2001: The University of Witten/Herdecke is accepted as a member of the German Rectors' Conference.

2005: The University converts all of its diploma programmes to bachelor/master programmes, accredited by the summer term of 2005.

2006: The University is urged to undergo a notable expansion of research and teaching at the Faculty of Medicine. In July 2006 the German Council of Science and Humanities approves the revised concept of the medical curriculum.

2007–2009: Witten/Herdecke hosts the Witten Lectures in Economics and Philosophy, with the purpose of "fostering philosophical reflection upon and proposing solutions to major economic and political issues". The series brings laureates of the Nobel Memorial Prize in Economic Sciences such as Kenneth Arrow, Thomas Schelling, and George Akerlof to Germany's first private university.

2008: The university undergoes its most severe crisis since its foundation. Internal problems, the general economic crisis, loss of major sponsors and withdrawal of public funds culminate in a threat of insolvency. In December 2009 the State Ministry of Innovation, Science, Research and Technology announces its intention to withdraw funding. Students and professors of the university protest outside the state parliament in Düsseldorf.

2009: Major internal restructuring efforts and a new shareholder agreement with new partners secure the financial stability of the university and its academic development.

2010: Implementation of new degree programmes: The interdisciplinary Bachelor programme "Philosophy, Politics and Economics (B.A.)" and the Master programme "Family Business Management (M.Sc.)".

2011: The German Council of Science and Humanities reaccredits Witten/Herdecke University for a further 7-year period in response to extensive revisions since 2005/06.

Colleges and degree programmes 
All colleges and schools offer doctorate programmes.

 College of Health
 Business School (also called "College of Management and Economics")
 College of Humanities and Arts
Studium fundamentale

Medical school 
The department of medicine is the largest department in the university. It was among the first in Germany to offer an integrated and reformed medical school curriculum. The curriculum emphasizes problem-based learning and extensive clinical rotations.  

Unlike most other German medical schools, admission to the university of Witten/Herdecke is based on a holistic, two-step process. Every semester 42 of about 1,400 applicants are accepted to the medical school.

Notable people
 Wolfgang Schad – founder of the Institute for Evolutionary biology

Rankings
Rankings by major German Newspapers such as Die Zeit, Der Spiegel, Frankfurter Allgemeine Zeitung, as well as the CHE University Ranking, the so-called "most comprehensive ranking" for German universities. The College of Medicine and the Business School are frequently ranked among the top 10 in Germany. In the CHE 2012 report the university's programmes in Economics, Dental Medicine and Human Medicine have received top rankings in student's and graduates satisfaction.

References

External links 

  

Private universities and colleges in Germany
Educational institutions established in 1982
Universities and colleges in North Rhine-Westphalia
1982 establishments in West Germany